These are the results of the November 6, 2005, municipal elections in Quebec for the region of Abitibi-Témiscamingue. Some mayors and councillors were elected without opposition from October 14, 2005. For the offices in election, other candidates are listed under the winner.

Amos
Electors: 9 611
Voters: 4 585 (48%)
 Mayor: Ulrick Chérubin
 Robert Audette
 Gilles Blais
 Denys Campeau
 Councillor 1: Marcel Labonté
 Councillor 2: Léandre Paré
 Councillor 3: André Goyette
 Councillor 4: Denis Chandonnet
 Councillor 5: Yvon Leduc
 Éric Mathieu
 Councillor 6: Héliodore Arseneault

Angliers
Electors: 248
Voters: 217 (88%)
 Mayor: Paul Coulombe
 Lyna Pine
 Councillor 1: Line Massie
 Bernadette Roberge
 Councillor 2: Marcelle Vilandré
 Alain Poitras
 Councillor 3: Richard Peluso
 Suzanne Perreault Laquerre
 Councillor 4: Pierre Marcotte
 Councillor 5: Yoland Trudel
 Councillor 6: Raynald Bernèche
 Françis Audet

Authier
 Mayor: Pierre Lambert
 Councillor 1: Angèle Auger
 Councillor 2: Joël Morissette
 Councillor 3: Marcel Cloutier
 Councillor 4: Ghislain Desaulniers
 Councillor 5: Serge Plante
 Councillor 6: Nathalie Ayotte

Authier-Nord
 Mayor: Alain Gagnon
 Councillor 1: Cécile Hélie
 Councillor 2: Lorrie Gagnon
 Councillor 3: Jean-Yves Sylvestre
 Councillor 4: Léopold Bergeron
 Councillor 5: Noëlla Dubé
 Councillor 6: Denis St-Georges

Barraute
 Mayor: Marcel Massé
 Councillor 1: Lionel Pelchat
 Michel Gagnon
 Councillor 2: Marc Hardy
 Councillor 3: Stéphane Alain
 Councillor 4: Nancy Habel
 Councillor 5: François Briand
 Councillor 6: Michel Leclerc

Béarn
 Mayor: Luc Lalonde
 Councillor 1: Stéphane Lessard
 Councillor 2: Ann Brunet Beaudry
 Caroline Guénette
 Councillor 3: Yvon Gagné
 Councillor 4: Claude Perreault
 Councillor 5: Ghislain Bellehumeur
 Councillor 6: André Bernard

Belcourt
 Mayor: Carol Nolet
 Councillor 1: Laurier Poirier
 Councillor 2: Guylaine Labbée
 Marie-Rose Auger
 Albert Kelly
 Councillor 3: Noël Gaudreault
 Councillor 4: Claude Arsenault
 Councillor 5: Lorraine Thibault
 Councillor 6: Mariette Auger

Belleterre
 Mayor: Jean-Pierre Charron
 Councillor 1: Diane Lefebvre
 Councillor 2: Guylaine Breton
 Councillor 3: Jean Quenneville
 Councillor 4: Roger Nantel
 Councillor 5: Bruno Boyer
 Councillor 6: Cécile Pichette

Berry
Electors: 410
Voters: 235 (57%)
 Mayor: Jules Grondin
 Jacques Hébert
 Councillor 1: Éric Leclerc
 Councillor 2: Jacques Dussault
 Councillor 3: Daniel Bouchard
 Councillor 4: Lise Rodrigue
 Councillor 5: Pierre Tessier
 Councillor 6: Vacancy

Champneuf
 Mayor: Rosaire Guénette
 Councillor 1: Réjean Normandin
 Councillor 2: Martin Chiasson
 Councillor 3: Jacques Jobin
 Councillor 4: Murielle Collin
 Councillor 5: Manon Beaudet
 Councillor 6: Stéphane Leduc

Chazel
 Mayor: Denis Hince
 Bertrand Guertin
 Councillor 1: Roger Cossette
 Councillor 2: Bertrand Guertin
 Councillor 3: Marcel Bouchard
 René Bouchard
 Councillor 4: Daniel Favreau
 Councillor 5: Donald Larouche
 Florianne Trépanier
 Councillor 6: Yves Frappier

Clermont
 Mayor: Lucie Hardy
 Councillor 1: Vacancy
 Councillor 2: Vacancy
 Councillor 3: Sylvain Champoux
 Councillor 4: Doris Souligny
 Councillor 5: Richard Lacombe
 Councillor 6: Vacancy

Clerval
 Mayor: Claude Lamoureux
 Councillor 1: Donald Boudreau
 Councillor 2: Gilles Auger
 Maurice Bordeleau
 Councillor 3: Nicole Therrien
 Councillor 4: Roger Robitaille
 Councillor 5: Mario Boutin
 Councillor 6: Rock Riopel
 Daniel Gauthier

Duhamel-Ouest
 Mayor: Alain Sarrazin
 Councillor 1: Gilles Adam
 Councillor 2: Pierre Lefort
 Councillor 3: Gilles Laplante
 Councillor 4: Martin Gaudet
 Richard Bergeron
 Councillor 5: Guy Abel
 Councillor 6: Jean-Yves Parent

Duparquet
 Mayor: Gilbert Rivard
 Councillor 1: Jean Samuel
 Éric Savard
 Councillor 2: Monique Lévesque Baril
 Councillor 3: Lise Julien
 Councillor 4: Wandalina Therrien
 Councillor 5: Patrick Taylor
 Councillor 6: Jasmine Gervais

Dupuy
 Mayor: Marc-André Côté
 Councillor 1: René Dessureault
 Councillor 2: Yvon Leclerc
 Councillor 3: Gérald Arseneault
 Councillor 4: Hélène Laliberté
 Councillor 5: Murielle Rossignol-Godin
 Councillor 6: Éric Lafontaine

Fugèreville
Electors: 357
Voters: 289 (81%)
Councillors 2, 3 and 5 were elected without opposition.
 Mayor: Kim Gauthier
 Councillor 1: Sylvain Falardeau
 Councillor 2: Charles Baril
 Councillor 3: Adrien Girard
 Councillor 4: Lise G. L'Heureux
 Councillor 5: Ghislain Gélinas
 Councillor 6: Yvon Payette

Gallichan
Electors: 380
Voters: 213 (56%)
Councillors 1, 2, 4 and 6 were elected without opposition.
 Mayor: Émilien Larochelle
 Councillor 1: Serge Marquis
 Councillor 2: Louis Naud
 Councillor 3: Denise Ouellet
 Councillor 4: Ginette Baril
 Councillor 5: Serge Vézina
 Councillor 6: Brigitte Rivard

Guérin
All elected without opposition.
 Mayor: Maurice Laverdière
 Councillor 1: France Bouthillette
 Councillor 2: Roger Rivard
 Councillor 3: Gilbert Racine
 Councillor 4: Mario Racine
 Councillor 5: Joey Gaudet
 Councillor 6: Monique Baril

Kipawa
All elected without opposition.
 Mayor: Marie Lefebvre
 Councillor 1: Murielle Bélanger
 Councillor 2: Marcel Pellerin
 Councillor 3: Margaret Hunter
 Councillor 4: Claude Carrière
 Councillor 5: Florent Lefebvre
 Councillor 6: Serge Larochelle

La Corne
Mayor and councillors 1, 2 and 6 were elected without opposition.
 Mayor: Michel Lévesque
 Councillor 1: Éric Comeau
 Councillor 2: André Gélinas
 Councillor 3: Aline Lapalme
 Councillor 4: René St-Pierre
 Councillor 5: Renald Moreau
 Councillor 6: Yanick Hamel

La Morandière
Electors: 223
Voters: 161 (72%)
Councillors 1, 4, 5 and 6 were elected without opposition.
 Mayor: Micheline Bureau
 Councillor 1: Lynda Plante
 Councillor 2: Léopold Carrier
 Councillor 3: André Desjardins
 Councillor 4: Georgette Rouisse-Coutu
 Councillor 5: Bernard Meilleur
 Councillor 6: Guy Lemire

La Motte
All elected without opposition.
 Mayor: René Martineau
 Councillor 1: Léopold Larouche
 Councillor 2: Jocelyne Lefebvre
 Councillor 3: Jean-Marc Albert
 Councillor 4: Jocelyne Wheelhouse
 Councillor 5: Vacancy
 Councillor 6: Luc St-Pierre

La Reine
Mayor and councillors 1, 2, 3, 5 and 6 were elected without opposition.
 Mayor: Jacques Perreault
 Councillor 1: Réjean Bernard
 Councillor 2: Jean-François Royer
 Councillor 3: Jean d'Avila Drainville
 Councillor 4: Yvonne Soulard
 Councillor 5: Jacques Michaud
 Councillor 6: Jean-Guy Boulet

La Sarre
Mayor and councillors 1, 2, 3, 4 and 5 were elected without opposition.
 Mayor: Normand Houde
 Councillor 1: Aldé Bellavance
 Councillor 2: Yves Dubé
 Councillor 3: Sylvain Boucher
 Councillor 4: Michel Allard
 Councillor 5: Louis Côté
 Councillor 6: Rita B. Barrette

Laforce
All elected without opposition.
 Mayor: Gérald Charron
 Councillor 1: Claude Fay
 Councillor 2: Ginette Morin
 Councillor 3: Marc Grondin
 Councillor 4: Madeleine Charbonneau
 Councillor 5: Josée Gaudet
 Councillor 6: Isabelle Morin

Landrienne
All elected without opposition.
 Mayor: François Lemieux
 Councillor 1: Maryse Bélanger
 Councillor 2: Réal Champagne
 Councillor 3: Steve Champagne
 Councillor 4: Carole Perron
 Councillor 5: Julie Auger
 Councillor 6: Richard Lecompte

Latulipe-et-Gaboury
Mayor and councillors 2, 4 and 6 were elected without opposition.
 Mayor: Réjean Paquin
 Councillor 1: Jocelyn Gingras
 Councillor 2: Rosaire Lefebvre
 Councillor 3: Guylaine Falardeau
 Councillor 4: Gérald Fortin
 Councillor 5: Céline Paradis
 Councillor 6: Réal Trudel

Launay
All elected without opposition.
 Mayor: Rosaire Thibeault
 Councillor 1: André Morin
 Councillor 2: Fernande Sylvain
 Councillor 3: Gilles Labbé
 Councillor 4: Carmelle Veillette
 Councillor 5: Claude Audy
 Councillor 6: Éloi Lambert

Laverlochère
Mayor and councillors 3 and 4 were elected without opposition.
 Mayor: Normand Bergeron
 Councillor 1: Nadia Bellehumeur
 Councillor 2: Rachelle Lambert
 Councillor 3: Daniel Barrette
 Councillor 4: Jacques Brassard
 Councillor 5: Suzie Bélanger
 Councillor 6: Réal Bélanger

Lorrainville
Electors: 1 068
Voters: 560 (52%)
Councillors 3, 5 and 6 were elected without opposition.
 Mayor: Marc Champagne
 Councillor 1: Denis Rochon
 Councillor 2: Denis Falardeau
 Councillor 3: Marco Latreille
 Councillor 4: Pierre Giaro
 Councillor 5: Céline Turcotte
 Councillor 6: Luc Bergeron x

Macamic
Electors: 2 024
Voters: 811 (40%)
Councillors 1, 2, 3 and 6 were elected without opposition.
 Mayor: Daniel Rancourt
 Councillor 1: Denise Dubois
 Councillor 2: Dianne Duchesne
 Councillor 3: Éric Poiré
 Councillor 4: Rock Morin
 Councillor 5: Marc Frappier
 Councillor 6: Yvan Verville

Malartic
Electors: 2 717
Voters: 1 190 (44%)
All councillors were elected without opposition.
 Mayor: Fernand Carpentier
 Councillor 1: Marie-Paule Ferron
 Councillor 2: Jude Boucher
 Councillor 3: Daniel Magnan
 Councillor 4: Laurier Verville
 Councillor 5: Jean Turgeon
 Councillor 6: Nicole Lamirande

Moffet
Mayor and councillors 1, 3, 5 and 6 were elected without opposition.
 Mayor: Michel Paquette
 Councillor 1: Nancy Paquette
 Councillor 2: David Parent
 Councillor 3: Joël Paquette
 Councillor 4: Thérèse Bouley
 Councillor 5: Luc Richards
 Councillor 6: Madeleine Duquet

Nédélec
All elected without opposition.
 Mayor: Carmen Rivard
 Councillor 1: Yves Bourassa
 Councillor 2: Michel Trépanier
 Councillor 3: Danielle Pelchat
 Councillor 4: Claude Gauvin
 Councillor 5: Denise B. Bernèche
 Councillor 6: Raynald Bernèche

Normétal
All elected without opposition.
 Mayor: Daniel Therrien
 Councillor 1: Jasmine Lampron
 Councillor 2: Vicky Gaudet
 Councillor 3: Bertrand Naud
 Councillor 4: Monique Bouchard
 Councillor 5: Manon Boisclair
 Councillor 6: Roger Lévesque

Notre-Dame-du-Nord
All elected without opposition.
 Mayor: Vacancy
 Councillor 1: Marielle Henri
 Councillor 2: Vacancy
 Councillor 3: Luc Plamondon
 Councillor 4: Ghislain Aylwin
 Councillor 5: Albert Bergeron
 Councillor 6: Christian Turpin

Palmarolle
All elected without opposition.
 Mayor: Pierre Vachon
 Councillor 1: Bertrand Châteauvert
 Councillor 2: Fernand Lemieux
 Councillor 3: Jacques St-Arnault
 Councillor 4: Andrée Tousignant
 Councillor 5: Sylvain Thibodeau
 Councillor 6: Pascal Pelland

Poularies
All elected without opposition.
 Mayor: Gino Levesque
 Councillor 1: Diane Bouchard
 Councillor 2: Solange Maheux
 Councillor 3: Johanne Bolduc
 Councillor 4: Sophie Dallaire
 Councillor 5: Patrick Thiffault
 Councillor 6: Vacancy

Preissac
All elected without opposition.
 Mayor: Jean-Yves Gingras
 Councillor 1: Léonard Brisson
 Councillor 2: Line Lafleur
 Councillor 3: Jules Pelchat
 Councillor 4: Pauline Marchand
 Councillor 5: Huguette Saucier
 Councillor 6: France Beaumier

Rapide-Danseur
Electors: 257
Voters: 173 (67%)
 Mayor: Gaston Gadoury
Councillors 1, 2 and 3 were elected without opposition.
 Councillor 1: Chantal Mireault
 Councillor 2: Darquise Blais
 Councillor 3: Fernand St-Cyr
 Councillor 4: Raymond Carrier
 Councillor 5: Pauline Lamont
 Councillor 6: Diane Béland

Rémigny
All elected without opposition.
 Mayor: Jocelyn Aylwin
 Councillor 1: Fernand Dubeau
 Councillor 2: David Martineau
 Councillor 3: Marilyn Aubin
 Councillor 4: Micheline Dufresne
 Councillor 5: Alain Filteau
 Councillor 6: Carole Coderre

Rivière-Héva
All elected without opposition.
 Mayor: Réjean Guay
 Councillor 1: Georges Émile Beaulieu
 Councillor 2: Philippe Authier
 Councillor 3: Marc Turcotte
 Councillor 4: Jean-Guy Lapierre
 Councillor 5: Fernand Beaulieu
 Councillor 6: Jean-Claude Racette

Rochebaucourt
All elected without opposition.
 Mayor: Daniel Lalancette
 Councillor 1: Ginette Harrison
 Councillor 2: Christiane Blouin
 Councillor 3: Omer Richard
 Councillor 4: Maurice Brouard
 Councillor 5: Marc-Antoine Pelletier
 Councillor 6: Robert Dugal

Roquemaure
Mayor and councillors 1, 2, 3, 5 and 6 were elected without opposition.
 Mayor: Marcel Mainville
 Councillor 1: Gérard Leclerc
 Councillor 2: Chantal Mainville
 Councillor 3: Léo Plourde
 Councillor 4: Alain Tremblay
 Councillor 5: Guylaine Pinard
 Councillor 6: Jocelyn Poirier

Rouyn-Noranda
Electors: 29 926
Voters: 15 087 (50%)
 Mayor: Roger Caouette
 Councillor 1: Léo Boisvert
 Councillor 2: Sylvie Turgeon
 Councillor 3: André Philippon
 Councillor 4: Mario Provencher
 Councillor 5: Denis Geoffroy
 Councillor 6: Claudette Boulanger
 Councillor 7: Marcel Loyer
 Councillor 8: Marielle Pellerin
 Councillor 9: Claude Fournel
 Councillor 10: Danielle Simard
 Councillor 11: Marcel Maheux
 Councillor 12: Pierre Rodrigue
 Councillor 13: Ronald Gaudet
 Councillor 14: René Ducharme

Saint-Bruno-de-Guigues
Mayor and councillors 2, 5 and 6 were elected without opposition.
 Mayor: Gérard Pétrin
 Councillor 1: Diane Hémond
 Councillor 2: Damien Lafond
 Councillor 3: Christine House
 Councillor 4: Andrée Boivin
 Councillor 5: Michel Lemire
 Councillor 6: Estelle Dorion

Saint-Dominique-du-Rosaire
All elected without opposition.
 Mayor: Maurice Godbout
 Councillor 1: Daniel St-Pierre
 Councillor 2: Josiane Ferron
 Councillor 3: Christian Legault
 Councillor 4: Gisèle St-Pierre
 Councillor 5: Patricia Vaillancourt
 Councillor 6: Michel J. Audette

Saint-Édouard-de-Fabre
All elected without opposition.
 Mayor: Serge Marcil
 Councillor 1: Mario Drouin
 Councillor 2: Camille Samson
 Councillor 3: Vacancy
 Councillor 4: Mario Perron
 Councillor 5: Denis Samson
 Councillor 6: Vacancy

Sainte-Germaine-Boulé
All elected without opposition.
 Mayor: Jaclin Bégin
 Councillor 1: Carole Samson
 Councillor 2: Richard Bisson
 Councillor 3: Dany Corriveau
 Councillor 4: Frédéric Audet
 Councillor 5: Sylvain Rancourt
 Councillor 6: Mélanie Morin

Sainte-Gertrude-Manneville
All elected without opposition.
 Mayor: Clément Turgeon
 Councillor 1: Huguette Chartier
 Councillor 2: Jonathan Vachon
 Councillor 3: Régis Audet
 Councillor 4: Julie Frappier
 Councillor 5: Ghislaine Vachon
 Councillor 6: Pascal Rheault

Sainte-Hélène-de-Mancebourg
All elected without opposition.
 Mayor: Florent Bédard
 Councillor 1: Careen Vachon
 Councillor 2: Raymond Matte
 Councillor 3: Sylvain Pomerleau
 Councillor 4: Frank Fournier
 Councillor 5: Raymonde Petitclerc
 Councillor 6: Lucien Major

Saint-Eugène-de-Guigues
All elected without opposition.
 Mayor: Vacancy
 Councillor 1: Germain Bastien
 Councillor 2: Guy Robert
 Councillor 3: Daniel Gemme
 Councillor 4: Jacques Plante
 Councillor 5: Yvan Jacques
 Councillor 6: Robert Henault

Saint-Félix-de-Dalquier
Mayor and councillors 1, 3, 4, 5 and 6 were elected without opposition.
 Mayor: Rosaire Mongrain
 Councillor 1: Luc Pomerleau
 Councillor 2: Éric Doyon
 Councillor 3: André Lévesque
 Councillor 4: Sylvain Sayeur
 Councillor 5: Lucien Sabourin
 Councillor 6: Jean-Guy Audet

Saint-Lambert
Electors: 185
Voters: 141 (76%)
Councillors 1, 2, 3, 5 and 6 were elected without opposition.
 Mayor: Marco Morin
 Councillor 1: Diane Provost
 Councillor 2: Yves Thériault
 Councillor 3: Yvon Thibeault
 Councillor 4: Ronald Marion
 Councillor 5: Daniel Garant
 Councillor 6: Michel Morin

Saint-Marc-de-Figuery
All elected without opposition October 14, 2005
 Mayor: Jacques Riopel
 Councillor 1: Jean-Jacques Trépanier
 Councillor 2: Diane Laverdière
 Councillor 3: André Nolet
 Councillor 4: Robert Cossette
 Councillor 5: Vacancy
 Councillor 6: Gilles Roy

Saint-Mathieu-d'Harricana
Electors: 557
Voters: 373 (67%)
All councillors were elected without opposition.
 Mayor: Gaétan Chénier
 Councillor 1: Martin Roch
 Councillor 2: Albert Laporte
 Councillor 3: Lise Noël
 Councillor 4: Pierre Laliberté
 Councillor 5: Félix Offroy
 Councillor 6: Gabriel Lemay

Senneterre (Parish)
Electors: 973
Voters: 531 (55%)
Councillors 1 and 2 were elected without opposition.
 Mayor: Céliane Taillefer
 Councillor 1: Marc Audet
 Councillor 2: Isabelle Servant
 Councillor 3: Michel Trudel
 Councillor 4: Anne Blain
 Councillor 5: Gilles Charron
 Councillor 6: Léopold Provencher

Senneterre (Ville)
Electors: 2 316
Voters: 1 262 (54%)
Councillors 1, 3 and 5 were elected without opposition.
 Mayor: Jean-Maurice Matte
 Councillor 1: Sylvie Des Roberts
 Councillor 2: René Paquin
 Councillor 3: Sylvie Beaudoin
 Councillor 4: Carole Chantal
 Councillor 5: André Lévesque
 Councillor 6: Serge Groleau

Taschereau
Mayor and councillors 2 and 6 were elected without opposition.
 Mayor: Jean-Marie Poulin
 Councillor 1: Céline Lambert
 Councillor 2: Gratien Landry
 Councillor 3: Patrick Landry
 Councillor 4: Normand Plante
 Councillor 5: Jocelyne Deschênes
 Councillor 6: Tony Gauthier

Témiscaming
Mayor and councillors 1, 2, 3 and 4 were elected without opposition.
 Mayor: Philippe Barette
 Councillor 1: Nicole Rochon
 Councillor 2: Josette McCann
 Councillor 3: Jacques Héroux
 Councillor 4: Pierre Gingras
 Councillor 5: Tanya Ladouceur
 Councillor 6: Gilbert Lacasse

Trécesson
Electors: 856
Voters: 374 (44%)
Councillors 1, 4, 5 and 6 were elected without opposition.
 Mayor: Jacques Trudel
 Councillor 1: Jean-Paul Tanguay
 Councillor 2: Alice Levasseur
 Councillor 3: Philippe Laferrière
 Councillor 4: Claude Ferland
 Councillor 5: Nathalie Dion
 Councillor 6: Édouard Lavoie

Val-d'Or
Electors: 23 088
Voters: 9 587 (42%)
Councillors 1, 3, 4 and 7 were elected without opposition.
 Mayor: Fernand Trahan
 Councillor 1: Suzanne Couture-Bordeleau
 Councillor 2: Yvon Frenette
 Councillor 3: Yolette Lévy
 Councillor 4: Céline Brindamour
 Councillor 5: Gilles Bérubé
 Councillor 6: Francis Murphy
 Councillor 7: André Gilbert
 Councillor 8: Claudia Chaput

Val-Saint-Gilles
Mayor and councillors 1, 2, 3, 4 and 6 were elected without opposition.
 Mayor: Benoît Sarrazin
 Councillor 1: Réal Paul
 Councillor 2: Marie-Rose Lavoie
 Councillor 3: Roger Paul
 Councillor 4: Katthy Beauchesne
 Councillor 5: Ghyslain-Guy Lavoie
 Councillor 6: Jean-Marie Lavoie

Ville-Marie
Mayor and councillors 2 and 5 were elected without opposition.
 Mayor: Sylvain Trudel
 Councillor 1: Richard Dessureault
 Councillor 2: Clément Couillard
 Councillor 3: Chantal Pelletier
 Councillor 4: Jean-Claude Adam
 Councillor 5: Denis Loiselle
 Councillor 6: Denis Brousseau

2005 Quebec municipal elections
Abitibi-Témiscamingue